The 1915–16 Danish National Football Tournament was the third Danish football championship under the Danish Football Association.

Provincial tournament
The Bornholm champion (IK Viking) did not participate for security reasons.

First round

Second round

Copenhagen Championship

Semifinal

Final

References
Denmark - List of final tables (RSSSF)

1915–16 in Danish football
Top level Danish football league seasons
Denmark